Bangabandhu Sheikh Mujibur Rahman Novo Theatre is a planetarium on Bijoy Sharani Avenue of Tejgaon area in Dhaka, Bangladesh.

History 
The Bangabandhu Sheikh Mujibur Rahman Novo Theatre opened to public on 25 September 2004. It was previously named Bhashani Novo Theatre. It was made autonomous by Bangabandhu Sheikh Mujibur Rahman Novo Theatre Bill 2010. The space center was commissioned by the Ministry of Science and Communication Technology of the Government of Bangladesh.

Description
Built on 5.46 acres of land, its spaces range in size from its 21-meter dome, seating 275 people; to three-meter inflatable and portable domes where people sit on the floor.

Design

The planetarium was designed by architect Ali Imam. The Planetarium dome simulates Earth and its cool blue sky. This dome-shaped theater was built with the latest equipment, enabling visitors to soar into space as well as experience the thrills of an interplanetary journey in a three-dimensional environment. The curved ceiling represents the sky and shows moving images of planets and stars through projection onto a large-screen dome at an angle of 120 degrees.

Features
This planetarium features three kinds of exhibits. They Journey to Infinity presents a celestial show of stars, planets and other heavenly bodies in virtual reality. The ai amader Bangladesh features Bangabandhu Sheik Mujibur Rahman's 7 March lecture, while The Grand Canyon describes North America's settlement clan, Garikhad, which existed in The Grand Canyon four thousand years ago.

Visitors need not look up in the dome to watch the show. Instead, they feel they are watching space live, with everything around them, presented by 150 projectors. The planetarium added a new capsule simulator and smart-step floor and 3D video. In 2013 the planetarium added a Nuclear Industrial Information Centre.

See also

 List of planetariums

References

External links
 Bangabandhu Sheikh Mujibur Rahman Novo Theatre On Facebook

Memorials to Sheikh Mujibur Rahman
Planetaria in Bangladesh
Buildings and structures in Dhaka
2004 establishments in Bangladesh
Research institutes in Bangladesh
Organisations based in Dhaka
Tourist attractions in Dhaka